This list of circle topics includes things related to the geometric shape, either abstractly, as in idealizations studied by geometers, or concretely in physical space. It does not include metaphors like "inner circle" or "circular reasoning" in which the word does not refer literally to the geometric shape.

Geometry and other areas of mathematics 

 Circle

 Circle anatomy
 Annulus (mathematics)
 Area of a disk
 Bipolar coordinates
 Central angle
 Circular sector
 Circular segment
 Circumference
 Concentric
 Concyclic
 Degree (angle)
 Diameter
 Disk (mathematics)
 Horn angle
 Measurement of a Circle
 
 List of topics related to 
 Pole and polar
 Power of a point
 Radical axis
 Radius
 Radius of convergence
 Radius of curvature
 Sphere
 Tangent lines to circles
 Versor

 Specific circles
 Apollonian circles
 Circles of Apollonius
 Archimedean circle
 Archimedes' circles – the twin circles doubtfully attributed to Archimedes
 Archimedes' quadruplets
 Circle of antisimilitude
 Bankoff circle
 Brocard circle
 Carlyle circle
 Circumscribed circle (circumcircle)
 Midpoint-stretching polygon
 Coaxal circles
 Director circle
 Fermat–Apollonius circle
 Ford circle
 Fuhrmann circle
 Generalised circle
 GEOS circle
 Great circle
 Great-circle distance
 Circle of a sphere
 Horocycle
 Incircle and excircles of a triangle
 Inscribed circle
 Johnson circles
 Magic circle (mathematics)
 Malfatti circles
 Nine-point circle
 Orthocentroidal circle
 Osculating circle
 Riemannian circle
 Schinzel circle
 Schoch circles
 Spieker circle
 Tangent circles
 Twin circles
 Unit circle
 Van Lamoen circle
 Villarceau circles
 Woo circles

 Circle-derived entities
 Apollonian gasket
 Arbelos
 Bicentric polygon
 Bicentric quadrilateral
 Coxeter's loxodromic sequence of tangent circles
 Cyclic quadrilateral
 Cycloid
 Ex-tangential quadrilateral
 Hawaiian earring
 Inscribed angle
 Inscribed angle theorem
 Inversive distance
 Inversive geometry
 Irrational rotation
 Lens (geometry)
 Lune
 Lune of Hippocrates
 Lazy caterer's sequence
 Overlapping circles grid
 Pappus chain
 Polar circle (geometry)
 Power center (geometry)
 Salinon
 Semicircle
 Squircle
 Steiner chain
 Tangential polygon
 Tangential quadrilateral

 Roulettes
 Centered trochoid
 Epitrochoid
 Epicycloid
 Cardioid
 Nephroid
 Deferent and epicycle
 Hypotrochoid
 Hypocycloid
 Astroid
 Deltoid curve

 Topology
 Borromean rings
 Circle bundle
 Quasicircle

 Circle-related theory
 Apollonius' problem
 Limiting cases of Apollonius' problem
 Belt problem
 Benz plane
 Bertrand's paradox (probability)
 Bonnesen's inequality
 Brahmagupta's formula
 Buffon's needle problem
 Bundle theorem
 Butterfly theorem
 Carnot's theorem
 Casey's theorem
 Circle graph
 Circle map
 Circle packing
 Circle packing in a circle
 Circle packing in an equilateral triangle
 Circle packing in an isosceles right triangle
 Circle packing theorem
 Introduction to Circle Packing – a book by Kenneth Stephenson
 Circular surface
 Clifford's circle theorems
 Compass and straightedge
 Mohr–Mascheroni theorem
 Poncelet–Steiner theorem
 Descartes' theorem
 Dinostratus' theorem
 Dividing a circle into areas
 Equal incircles theorem
 Five circles theorem
 Gauss circle problem
 Gershgorin circle theorem
 Geometrography
 Goat grazing problem
 Hadamard three-circle theorem
 Hardy–Littlewood circle method
 Isoperimetric problem
 Japanese theorem for cyclic polygons
 Japanese theorem for cyclic quadrilaterals
 Kosnita's theorem
 Lester's theorem
 Milne-Thomson circle theorem
 Miquel's theorem
 Monge's theorem
 Mrs. Miniver's problem
 Pivot theorem
 Pizza theorem
 Squaring the circle
 Poncelet's porism
 Ptolemy's theorem
 Ptolemy's table of chords
 Regiomontanus' angle maximization problem
 Ring lemma
 Seven circles theorem
 Six circles theorem
 Smallest circle problem
 Tammes problem
 Tarski's circle-squaring problem
 Thales' theorem

 Circle tangents in non-geometric theory
 Circle criterion
 Circle group
 Group of rational points on the unit circle
 Circular algebraic curve
 Circular distribution
 Circular statistics
 Mean of circular quantities
 Polygon-circle graph
 Splitting circle method
 von Mises distribution
 Wigner semicircle distribution
 Wrapped distribution
 Wrapped Cauchy distribution
 Wrapped normal distribution

 Other topics
 Thomas Baxter (mathematician)

Physical sciences and engineering

 Centrifugal force  
 Centripetal force  
 Circle of confusion  
 Circle of forces  
 Circular dichroism  
 Circular orbit  
 Mohr's circle  
 Non-uniform circular motion  
 Thomson problem  
 Uniform circular motion

Geography

 Circle of latitude  
 List of circles of latitude
 Polar circle
 Arctic Circle  
 Antarctic Circle  
 Equator  
 Tropic of Cancer  
 Tropic of Capricorn  
 Great-circle distance  
 Position circle

Artifacts

 Addendum circle  
 Belt problem  
 Center pivot irrigation  
 Circular ditches  
 Circular slide rule  
 Compass (drafting)  
 Crop circle  
 Dip circle  
 List of gear nomenclature  
 Peaucellier–Lipkin linkage  
 Pitch circle  
 Repeating circle  
 Timber circle  
 Traffic circle  
 List of circles in Washington, D.C.  
 List of traffic circles in New Jersey  
 Setting circles  
 Stone circle  
 Wheel

Glyphs and symbols
 Borromean rings
 Circled dot (disambiguation)
 Circles in Polish mythology
 Crescent
 Dotted circle
 Enso
 Magic circle
 Olympic emblem
 Ouroboros
 Petosiris to Nechepso
 Quatrefoil
 Ring (diacritic)
 Roundel
 Sacred Chao
 Shield of the Trinity
 Solar symbols
 Squared-circle postmark
 Sun cross
 Symbol of Tanit
 Trefoil
 Triquetra
 Vesica piscis
 Triple Goddess symbol
 Yin and yang

See also
 List of specially named circles
 Circle (disambiguation)
 Wandering in circles

 
Outlines of mathematics and logic
Wikipedia outlines
Lists of shapes